Unearthed Films is a U.S. film distribution and production company that imports exploitation films primarily from Eastern Asia.

History
The company was created by Stephen Biro, Paul White and Rhett Rushing. Their initial releases were the first official North American releases of the cult Japanese Guinea Pig film series.

In 2013, Unearthed entered into film production. Their initial films were American versions of the Guinea Pig series.

Filmography

North American distribution

Productions

References

External links
 Unearthed Films

Film distributors of the United States